Ralf Stegner (born 2 October 1959) is a political scientist and a German politician of the Social Democratic Party (SPD) who has been serving as a member of the German Bundestag for the constituency of Pinneberg since the 2021 elections.

Stegner was the leader of the SPD in Schleswig-Holstein from 2007 to 2019. He also served as the leader of the position in Schleswig-Holstein from 2017 to 2021, an office he had previously held from July 2009 to June 2012. He is considered a member of the SPD's left wing.

Early life and education
Stegner was born in Bad Dürkheim, Germany on October 2, 1959, and received his high school diploma in 1978. 
In addition to his degree in Political Science, History and German from the University of Freiburg (1980-1987), Stegner earned a Master of Public Administration from the Kennedy School of Government at Harvard University (1987–1989).

Political career

Role in state politics
From 1990 to 1994, Stegner served as a spokesman for the Schleswig-Holstein Ministry of Social Affairs, Kiel. From 1994 to 1996 he was head of staff department, Ministry of Social Affairs Schleswig Holstein, Kiel. From 1996 to 2005, Stegner served in various roles in the state government of Minister-President Heide Simonis. He was State Secretary for Labor, Social Affairs and Health from 1996 to 1998 before serving as State Secretary for Education, Research and Cultural Affairs from 1998 to 2003. Between 2003 and until Simonis’ resignation in 2005, he was the State Minister of Finance.

Stegner has been a member of the Landtag of Schleswig-Holstein since the 2005 state elections. After Simonis's attempt to form a new one-seat majority red-green government supported by a regional party had failed because throughout four secret ballots one representative had not voted for her, she withdrew from politics and Stegner practically took over from her and became Deputy Minister-President and State Minister for Home Affairs in the subsequent CDU-SPD grand coalition led by Minister-President Peter Harry Carstensen. Although Stegner had harshly criticised the unknown person who had refused to vote for Simonis, he was initially considered to have been the so-called "Heide murderer" by some media, which is generally regarded as refuted because Simonis suspected another person and had planned to pass her office on to Stegner after two years. In 2007 he formally succeeded her as he was elected chairman of the Schleswig-Holstein SPD.

When the SPD ministers left the coalition government, which had been in constant dispute over several issues, in 2008, Stegner became SPD candidate for Minister-President in the early 2009 elections. Following their electoral defeat, he became chairman of the party's parliamentary group and thereby leader of the opposition against the Carstensen government. He was unsuccessful in his attempt to become the party's candidate again for the 2012 elections; Mayor of Kiel Torsten Albig was chosen instead and subsequently elected to the office. Stegner chose not to return to a ministerial office in Albig's government and kept the offices of party and parliamentary chairman of the SPD. After Albig's defeat in the 2017 elections, Stegner became leader of the opposition for the second time. In 2019 he was succeeded by Serpil Midyatli in his state party office but remained parliamentary and opposition leader.

Role in national politics
Stegner was a SPD delegate to the Federal Convention for the purpose of electing the President of Germany in 2009, 2010 and 2012. In the negotiations to form a Grand Coalition of Chancellor Angela Merkel's Christian Democrats (CDU together with the Bavarian CSU) and the SPD following the 2013 federal elections, he was part of the SPD delegation in the working group on education and research policy, led by Johanna Wanka and Doris Ahnen.

At the SPD national convention in 2014, party chairman Sigmar Gabriel nominated Stegner as one of his six deputies, alongside Hannelore Kraft, Olaf Scholz, Manuela Schwesig, Thorsten Schäfer-Gümbel and Aydan Özoğuz. In the 2019 SPD leadership election, he announced his intention to run for the position as co-chair in the party's new dual leadership, together with the party's two-time presidential candidate Gesine Schwan. Saskia Esken and Norbert Walter-Borjans won the nomination and Stegner retired from his position of deputy chairman. He was ultimately succeeded by Serpil Midyatli again. In December 2019, Stegner called for a merger between the SPD and The Left.

Member of the German Parliament, 2021–present
Since the 2021 elections, Stegner has been a member of the German Bundestag, representing the Pinneberg district. In parliament, he has since been serving on the Committee on Foreign Affairs and its Subcommittee on Disarmament, Arms Control and Non-Proliferation. Since 2022, he has also been a member of the Parliamentary Oversight Panel (PKGr), which provides parliamentary oversight of Germany’s intelligence services BND, BfV and MAD.

Other activities

Corporate boards
 HSH Nordbank, Ex-Officio Member of the Supervisory Board (2005-2008)
 KfW, Member of the Board of Supervisory Directors (-2005)

Non-profit organizations
 Federal Academy for Security Policy (BAKS), Member of the Advisory Board (since 2022)
 Friedrich Ebert Foundation, Member of the Board of Trustees
 German United Services Trade Union (ver.di), Member

Personal life
Stegner is married, and has three children.

References

External links 

 Official Website 

1959 births
Living people
People from Bad Dürkheim
Social Democratic Party of Germany politicians
Members of the Landtag of Schleswig-Holstein
Harvard Kennedy School alumni
Ministers of the Schleswig-Holstein State Government
Members of the Bundestag 2021–2025